The Doftana (sometimes: Doftana Ardeleană) is a left tributary of the river Tărlung in Romania. It flows into the Tărlung in Brădet, a village of Săcele.

References

Rivers of Romania
Rivers of Brașov County